Lonnie Nelson Cowles (December 9, 1930 – August 30, 2021) was an American politician. He served as a Democratic member in the Texas House of Representatives from 1961 to 1967.

References

1930 births
2021 deaths
Democratic Party members of the Texas House of Representatives
People from Hallsville, Texas